Donald Burns Blackwood MC (3 November 1884 – 25 June 1967) was the third bishop of Gippsland from 1942 to 1954.

Blackwood was educated at the University of Tasmania and ordained in 1908.  From 1912 to 1920 he was a chaplain in the Australian Armed Forces. Later he held incumbencies at Latrobe and Cressy. Whilst incumbent of Cressy (1921-24), he was also Warden of St Wilfrid's Theological College, Cressy. In 1929 he was appointed Archdeacon of Hobart, a position he held until his ordination to the episcopate.

References

1884 births
People from Tasmania
University of Tasmania alumni
Recipients of the Military Cross
Anglican archdeacons in Australia
Anglican bishops of Gippsland
1967 deaths
20th-century Anglican bishops in Australia
Australian military chaplains
World War I chaplains